Aimee Nicole E. Fuller (born 21 July 1991) is a British slopestyle snowboarder who represented Great Britain at the 2014 Winter Olympics and the 2018 Winter Olympics.

Early life
Fuller was born in Farnborough, in London, and grew up in nearby Keston. She moved to Washington D.C., USA, in 2003 aged 12, attending the British School of Washington, but moved back to the UK at the age of 16 to live in Northern Ireland where she attended Sullivan Upper School in Holywood.

Career
Fuller finished 5th in the 2017 World Rankings and 3rd in the World Cup Big Air Super Series Tour. British Champion 2017 Slopestyle and Big Air. 7th in the overall rankings 2013/14 . She has competed at the X Games, finishing 6th in the Winter X Games in Europe, eighth in the Winter X Games XVII in 2013 and seventh in the Winter X Games XVIII in 2014.

Fuller is a 2 X Olympian, competed for Great Britain at the 2014 Winter Olympics in Sochi, Russia. In the women's slopestyle event she scored 39.00 on her first run and 44.50 on her second run during her heat to finish tenth and so did not qualify directly for the final. She then competed in the semi-finals of the competition scoring 33.75 on her first run and 37.50 on her second run to finish in ninth place, missing out on qualification for the finals and finishing in 17th position overall. Following her elimination Fuller joined the BBC Sport commentary team for the final of her event as compatriot Jenny Jones won a bronze medal, the nation's first ever Olympic medal on snow. Fuller and the other members of the commentary team – Ed Leigh and Tim Warwood – were criticised for their bias towards the British competitor, Jenny Jones, and a "deeply unprofessional display of commentary"; the presenters also cheered when Jones' competitor, Anna Gasser, fell during her run. The incident drew more than 300 complaints.

In April 2019 Fuller ran her first marathon, the Pyongyang Marathon in North Korea.

References

External links

 Aimee Fuller at the International Ski Federation
 
 

1991 births
Living people
English female snowboarders
Snowboarders at the 2014 Winter Olympics
Snowboarders at the 2018 Winter Olympics
Olympic snowboarders of Great Britain
People from Farnborough, London
Snowboarders from Northern Ireland